Andrena carlini, the Carlinville miner bee, is a species of miner bee in the family Andrenidae. It is found in North America.

References

External links

 

carlini
Articles created by Qbugbot
Insects described in 1901